Chandini Chowdary is an Indian actress who works in Telugu films. She appeared as a lead in Kundanapu Bomma, Howrah Bridge, Colour Photo, Bombhaat, Super Over and Sammathame.

Early life 
Chandini Chowdary was born as Ranjani in a Telugu-speaking family in Visakhapatnam, Andhra Pradesh. She graduated in mechanical engineering from a college in Bangalore.

Career 
Before making her film debut, Chowdary acted in a many short films while studying in Bangalore. Some of the short films are Prema Prema, Love at First Sight, True Love, Approach, Proposal, Madhuram, Sambar Idli, Lucky, Two Side Love, Fall in Love, and Romeo and Juliet. One of her short films with actor Raj Tarun, 'The Blind Date,' brought her recognition.

Chowdary played the lead in Ketugadu (2015), Kundanapu Bomma (2016), Shamanthakamani (2017) and Howrah Bridge (2018). Her performance in the web series Masti's was critically acclaimed. She garnered acclaim for her role in Manu (2018). In 2020, she starred in Colour Photo opposite Suhas in which she received praise for her acting skills. Her final release in 2022 was Sammathame.

Filmography

Film

Television

References

External links

Actresses in Telugu cinema
Living people
Indian film actresses
21st-century Indian actresses
1991 births
Actresses from Visakhapatnam
Telugu actresses